Grim Justice is a 1916 British silent drama film directed by Laurence Trimble and starring Florence Turner, Henry Edwards, Malcolm Cherry.

Cast
 Florence Turner as Chrystal Transom 
 Henry Edwards as Gideon Midhurst 
 Malcolm Cherry as James Midhurst 
 Winnington Barnes as Jude Transom 
 Una Venning as Drucilla Midhurst 
 Dorothy Rowan as Hester Midhurst 
 Moore Marriott as Grandfather Transom 
 Maud Williams as Stepmother

References

Bibliography
 Low, Rachael. History of the British Film, 1914-1918. Routledge, 2005.

External links

1916 films
1916 drama films
British silent feature films
British drama films
Films set in England
Films directed by Laurence Trimble
Films based on British novels
Butcher's Film Service films
1910s English-language films
1910s British films
Silent drama films